Snehangshu Kanta Acharya Institute of Law (popularly known as S.K.A.I.L) is a college of legal education in Kalyani, West Bengal. This college is having its own campus on an area of seven acres of land within the campus of University of Kalyani, adjacent to the University entrance gate. It was established in the year 2004. The college is affiliated to University of Kalyani. This college is also approved by the Bar Council of India.

History 
The institute was established by Sikkim Bengal Education Trust in 2004 on the campus of Kalyani University. It is named after Snehansu Kanta Acharya Bar-at-Law, the former Advocate General of the Government of West Bengal, known for his contributions in the field of law and politics. The college was inaugurated on 30 June 2004 by Mr. Jyoti Basu, former Chief Minister of West Bengal.

Courses 
It offers the Bachelor of Laws or B.A LL.B degree course with LL.B. Honours for five years integrated degree programme as the under-graduate degree programme in law under the University of kalyani. The present course is based on 10 semester and approved by the West Bengal Council of Higher Secondary Education as well as Bar Council of India (BCI).

See also

References

External links 

University of Kalyani
University Grants Commission
National Assessment and Accreditation Council

Law schools in West Bengal
Universities and colleges in Nadia district
Colleges affiliated to University of Kalyani
Educational institutions established in 2004
2004 establishments in West Bengal